Harry Warner (previously Thompson-Warner) is a fictional character on the New Zealand soap opera Shortland Street who first appeared onscreen in May 2002. Being born on screen during the shows 10th anniversary, Harry has been portrayed by several child actors and by Reid Walker since 2009. In May 2017 Harry left for an exchange program in Japan.

Creation and casting
In 2001 the shows producers decided to undergo a story that saw Toni Thompson (Laura Hill) give birth prematurely during the soap operas 10th anniversary. After the initial birth scenes, Callum Campbell-Ross was cast in the role due his small size resembling that of a premature baby and due to his family living close to the studio where the soap was filmed. It was decided the role of Harry would be recast in 2006 after Directors struggled to convince 3 year old Campbell-Ross to film "naughty boy" scenes where he broke a sandcastle. Henry Williams had auditioned for the character of a child patient, but was contacted to see whether he would be interested in playing Harry. In 2009 producers made the decision to recast the role so as to make way for new story directions and characterisation. The pitch was brought up during a meeting with directors and was originally met with hesitation. Reid Walker had previously auditioned for several different roles over several years and had never been called back. In 2009 he was contacted to audition for the recast of Harry. Prior to this, Walker had considered giving up on his acting dream but within one audition, he won the role. He debuted in September 2009 at the age of 9. During his first few years Walker was a minor member of cast, filming 2 scenes a week, but by 2014 he was a "senior" member and was filming 15 as well as having his own storylines. After having appeared on the show for over 8 years, Walker departed the show as a regular cast member to attend university. He continued to make guest appearances in 2017 and in 2018. Harry appeared in flashback footage in January 2021.

Storylines
In 2001 Toni Thompson (Laura Hill) fell pregnant but it was not clear who the father was as she had been sleeping with both Adam Heywood (Leighton Cardno) and Chris Warner (Michael Galvin). She gave birth several months prematurely in May 2002 and it was not until Rachel McKenna (Angela Bloomfield) had the babies DNA tested that Chris was revealed as the father. In 2003 Harry went missing and it was soon revealed he had been kidnapped by a mentally unstable Donna Heka (Stephanie Tauevihi). The following year he was kidnapped again, this time by Toni's former flame, Logan King (Peter Muller). In 2004 Harry and Toni were kidnapped by Toni's deranged brother Dominic (Shane Cortese) in an attempt to kill Chris. Harry caused trouble for Chris and Toni the following year, when his tantrums climaxed in him biting Huia Samuels (Nicola Kawana) hand. Toni fled Ferndale in 2007 and took Harry with her but upon their return, the family scraped death in a dramatic car crash. Harry was devastated months later when Toni died and struggled to come to terms with Chris' succession of girlfriends – going so far as to force him to break up with Brooke Freeman (Beth Allen). In 2010 Harry struggled to cope with the revelation he had a brother, Phoenix (Geordie Holibar) but grew to love him. He clashed with Chris' girlfriend Rachel McKenna and pressed charges when she lightly slapped him. During Halloween 2013, Harry stopped breathing and lost his heart beat for 45 minutes after drinking a potion made of several garden weeds, including foxglove. However, after Chris used his chief executive officer position at the hospital to register prolonged CPR, Harry survived without brain damage. In early 2015 Harry met Pixie Hannah (Thomasin McKenzie) and after initial clashes, the two began to date. However Pixie was diagnosed with bone cancer and Harry supported her through the following treatment but was devastated when she succumbed to pneumonia shortly after the two had confessed their love. Harry leaves in early 2017 to attend an exchange program in Japan only to then get transferred to Shanghai, China. He then appears in a Skype call with his Dad. Harry would return in October 2017 after it was revealed he had gotten his homestay sister, Zhilan Li pregnant after falling in love with her. Zhilan proceeded to escape to New Zealand to find Harry, but Harry decided not to ask Chris for help after witnessing him paying off Mindy, Frank's ex-wife. He was secretly given allowances by Finn after Chris decided to cut him off financially.

In 2018, he returned from Shanghai to attend Finn's wedding, however, Frank sensed that he has been unhappy, as he is very lonely in China because he is still unable to make friends in Shanghai, and unable to adapt to the hectic Chinese lifestyle. It was also suggested that he has prenatal depression. In June, he called Chris, saying that Zhilan has given birth months premature. Chris flew to Shanghai to help with Zhilan's recovery after she lost a lot of blood after she had given birth. On 29 October, Harry returned home in New Zealand with his son, Xun while sneaking out of Zhilan's house. Next day, Zhilan's father tracked him down and threatened to kill.

Character development
Following the death of Harry's mother Toni Warner (Laura Hill), Hill hoped that the development of the character would be influenced, "It would be nice to think there would be floods of tears for months on end but that's not going to happen, is it? I imagine Chris Warner will find someone to fill the empty bed pretty dam quick going on from past form. I think Harry will be sadder for longer. I hope so." The casting of Reid Walker in the role of Harry saw the character develop from a "wayward child" to a "rebellious pre-teen". In 2011 Harry was featured in a storyline that saw his fathers girlfriend, Rachel McKenna (Angela Bloomfield) illegally discipline him when she smacked him. Rachel was an inexperienced parent and as such, Bloomfield had to forget her own maternal nature, "As a mum, my responses are now automatic. So when I was playing Rachel in this role, I tried to forget about what now comes naturally as a parent ... Rachel eventually breaks, and that's when she smacks him. It all happens pretty quickly and she immediately realises she has crossed a line." Bloomfield was uneasy filming the storyline, "It felt really inappropriate – even filming the scene!" During filming, Walker wore cushions in his pants so that Bloomfield would not be physically hitting him.

In 2014 when the character was entering his teenage years, Harry started to move away from his recurring manner and take up his own storylines. Walker enjoyed the transition, "It's been nice to move on from minor parts in plotlines to actual stuff that concerns my character ... I've enjoyed the journey. I look forward to wherever the writers take me next." The storyline dealt with his discomfort with Chris after he lied about fathering a daughter, Trinity Kwan (Maya Ruriko Doura).

'Dick pic' storyline
Whilst discussing storylines for Harry in 2017, producer Maxine Fleming encouraged writers to storyline a coming of age plot where he lost his virginity. It was decided to incorporate in sexting so as to appear "contemporary". Galvin was pleased to be given the storyline, "I couldn't wait. It was fantastic. We live for these kinds of things. I was so excited about the scene, when it came to do it I didn't want to ruin it." The storyline unfolded with Harry photographing his genitalia for his girlfriend Lily only for it to be synced with the family tablet and for Chris to find it. The cliffhanger of the episode then revolved around Chris confronting Harry with the line "Please tell me that is not your penis!" Due to the hilarity of the dialogue, the filming of the scene took 3 takes. Fleming explained the decision to include the 'dick pic', "It is a comedy story, but like all good comedy there's a truth at the core of it, and it is social commentary, that story. Many teens are doing stuff like this, and many parents are worried about it." The cliffhanger went viral and Fleming expressed apologies to Galvin for the dialogue, "I think Michael now is going to have that line shouted at him across the street. ... So I'm sorry about that Michael!"

Reception
Harry has been referred to as the, "most annoying character on the show." Walker himself admitted Harry was an annoying character, but stressed that he was not much like his part. Co-star Angela Bloomfield (Rachel McKenna) praised Walker for his acting during the 2011 illegal smacking storyline, "Reid did a fantastic job. He really pulled out all his menace to play that part." Harry was voted by fans as the runner up for character they would like to leave the show the most, in the Ferndale Talk Best of 2013 Awards. Television reviewer Chris Philpot stated he hated advertising more than asset sales and Harry Warner combined. Matthew Denton of the University of Auckland student magazine, Craccum, named Harry the most annoying character on Shortland Street, citing that the "spoilt whiney kid has been around for ages, causing grief for everyone" and expressed annoyance that Chris had saved his life in 2013.

The 'dick pic' cliffhanger went massively viral after airing, gaining international attention. In the week following the screening, a clip of the scene received over half a million views. A British journalist referred to it as, "the best ending to a soap ever" whilst a reporter for The Spinoff referred to it as an "iconic moment for New Zealand television". Columnist Alex Casey coined it as the New Zealand television moment of 2017 and noted how it had become a meme. Ethan Sills of The New Zealand Herald believed the storyline would be hard to top for the shows 2017 season. American television host Jimmy Kimmel proclaimed on his late-night talk show that, "I know a hell of a cliffhanger when I see one", before he recreated the scene playing Harry with Alec Baldwin portraying Chris. The line was voted by the New Zealand public as the 2017 quote of the year.

References

Shortland Street characters
Television characters introduced in 2002
Child characters in television
Male characters in television